Alan Russell Bishop  is a New Zealand academic. He is a professor of Māori education at the University of Waikato, and the director of Te Kotahitanga, a research programme.  He co-authored Culture Counts: Changing Power Relations in Education with Ted Glynn, another University of Waikato professor.

In the 2016 New Year Honours, Bishop was appointed an Officer of the New Zealand Order of Merit for services to Māori and education.

References

Year of birth missing (living people)
Living people
People from Hamilton, New Zealand
Academic staff of the University of Waikato
Officers of the New Zealand Order of Merit